(born 1975) is a Japanese model and actress.

Life and career
Ono began her career as a fashion and gravure model and was featured as the 1997 Asahi Kasei swimsuit Campaign Model.

In 1998, she starred in the erotic action-thriller V-cinema production Zero Woman Returns, part of the long-running "Zero Woman" series. A year later she appeared in the yakuza film  which was released in July 1999. Ono also had a featured role in the January 2002 drama . She was also a regular on the TBS variety show  which was broadcast from 1998 to 2002.

She left the entertainment field in 2002 to pursue a business career as an esthetician.

Filmography
 Zero Woman: Saigo no shirei (1998 aka Zero Woman Returns) - V-cinema
  (1999)
  (2000)
  (2002)

References

External links

1975 births
Living people
Japanese female adult models
Place of birth missing (living people)